Haberdashers' Aske's School may refer to:
Haberdashers' Aske's Boys' School, Elstree, Hertfordshire
Haberdashers' Aske's School for Girls, Elstree,  Hertfordshire
It may also refer to:
Haberdashers' Knights Academy, Downham, London Borough of Lewisham
Haberdashers' Hatcham College, New Cross, London Borough of Lewisham
Haberdashers' Crayford Academy, Crayford, London Borough of Bexley

See also
Worshipful Company of Haberdashers#List of Haberdasher schools